Ervin King "Zaza" Harvey (January 5, 1879 – June 3, 1954) was an outfielder in Major League Baseball who played from 1900 to 1902 for the Chicago Orphans, Chicago White Sox, and Cleveland Bronchos.

Pro career
Zaza Harvey made his professional debut at the age of 18 for the Minneapolis Millers of the Western League. He lost all three starts as a pitcher that season, and appeared in two others as a outfielder, getting just two hits in nine at bats for a paltry .222 batting average. During the 1897 season, he also played briefly for the Peoria Blackbirds as well. He made it to the majors with the Chicago Orphans in 1900, appearing in a handful of games as a pitcher and in the outfield. After the brief cup of coffee, Harvey returned to the minors before he split his time in the American League between the Chicago White Sox and Cleveland Indians. Harvey hit five homers for Cleveland in 1901. He appeared in twelve games for Cleveland in 1902, making his final MLB appearance on May 4, 1902.

Had Harvey had enough plate appearances in 1901, he would have qualified for the batting title, as he finished the season with a 353 batting average. Cleveland liked Harvey's talents enough that they signed him for the 1902 season, but with one condition: his days on the mound were over and he was going to be strictly an outfielder. Through 12 games in 1902, Harvey was batting .348 and had one stolen base to his credit. However, Harvey had been suffering from various stomach ailments, and after what would be his final appearance in the majors in May 1902, Harvey left the Indians and sought medical treatment for his stomach by going to the hot springs of West Baden Illinois, a popular destination for those who sought refuge from various ailments. Harvey thought he had improved but the issues flared up when he was home in California. He attempted a comeback after sitting out the 1903 season, but was just too ill. He retired from baseball in 1904 at the age of 23.

See also
List of Major League Baseball single-game hits leaders

References

External links

1879 births
1954 deaths
Major League Baseball outfielders
Chicago Orphans players
Chicago White Sox players
Cleveland Blues (1901) players
Cleveland Bronchos players
Minneapolis Millers (baseball) players
Peoria Blackbirds players
Sacramento Gilt Edges players
Baseball players from California
19th-century baseball players
People from Saratoga, California